Billingley is a village and civil parish in the Metropolitan Borough of Barnsley, in South Yorkshire, England,  east of Barnsley. At the 2001 census it had a population of 177, increasing to 210 at the 2011 Census.

See also
Listed buildings in Billingley

References

External links

http://billingleyvillage.co.uk/

Villages in South Yorkshire
Geography of the Metropolitan Borough of Barnsley
Civil parishes in South Yorkshire